The 1946 United States Senate special election in Kentucky was held on November 5, 1946, to complete the unexpired term of Senator Happy Chandler, who resigned to become Commissioner of Baseball. Interim Senator William A. Stanfill did not run for the full term. Republican John Sherman Cooper defeated Democratic former U.S. Representative John Y. Brown to complete the term.

This was the first of seven consecutive elections to this seat (three special and four regular) in twenty years for which Cooper was the Republican nominee.

Background
Incumbent Senator Happy Chandler resigned to become Commissioner of Baseball on November 1, 1945. Governor Simeon Willis appointed William A. Stanfill to fill the vacant seat until a successor could be duly elected. The special election was scheduled for November 5, 1946, concurrent with the general election.

General election

Candidates
John Young Brown, former U.S. Representative at-large (Democratic)
John Sherman Cooper, circuit judge and former State Representative from Pulaski County (Republican)
W. E. Sandefur (Socialist)

Results

See also
1946 United States Senate elections

Notes

References 

1946 (special)
Kentucky
United States Senate
Kentucky 1946
Kentucky 1946
United States Senate 1946